Ella in Hollywood is a live 1961 (see 1961 in music) album by Ella Fitzgerald, with a jazz quartet led by Lou Levy, recorded in Hollywood, Los Angeles.

This album features Ella at the height of her vocal powers, one month before the recording one of her more critically acclaimed studio albums, Clap Hands, Here Comes Charlie!.

Ella in Hollywood features several songs that serve as starting points for Ella's seemingly effortless scat solos, and a selection of beautiful ballads balance out the album.

For many years, the album was only available on CD as a Japanese import, but in April 2009 Verve finally gave it a worldwide CD release.

Track listing
For the 1961 Verve LP release; Verve MG V-4052; Re-issued in 2009 on CD, Verve 06025 17967007

Side One:
 "This Could Be the Start of Something Big" (Steve Allen)  – 2:33
 "I've Got the World on a String" (Harold Arlen, Ted Koehler)  – 3:44
 "You're Driving Me Crazy" (Walter Donaldson)  – 3:23
 "Just in Time" (Betty Comden, Adolph Green, Jule Styne)  – 1:56
 "It Might as Well Be Spring" (Oscar Hammerstein II, Richard Rodgers)  – 3:07
 "Take the "A" Train" (Billy Strayhorn)  – 9:04
Side Two:
 "Stairway to the Stars" (Matty Malneck, Mitchell Parish, Frank Signorelli)  – 3:56
 "(If You Can't Sing It) You'll Have to Swing It (Mr. Paganini)" (Sam Coslow)  – 4:05
 "Satin Doll" (Duke Ellington, Johnny Mercer, Strayhorn)  – 2:53
 "Blue Moon" (Richard Rodgers, Lorenz Hart)  – 3:17
 "Baby, Won't You Please Come Home?" (Charles Warfield, Clarence Williams)  – 3:41
 "Air Mail Special" (Charlie Christian, Benny Goodman, Jimmy Mundy)  – 5:26

Personnel 
Recorded live, May 11- May 21, 1961, Hollywood, Los Angeles:

 Ella Fitzgerald - Vocals
 Wilfred Middlebrooks - Bass
 Lou Levy - Piano
 Gus Johnson - Drums
 Herb Ellis - Guitar
Note: The vinyl LP issued on verve, V-4052 indicates, incorrectly that the guitarist was Jim Hall.

References 

Ella Fitzgerald live albums
Albums produced by Norman Granz
1961 live albums
Verve Records live albums